George Worthing Yates (14 August 1901 in New York City – 6 June 1975 in Sonoma) was an American screenwriter and author. His early work was on serials shown in cinemas; he later progressed to feature films, primarily science fiction. He was the nephew of the head of Republic Pictures, Herbert Yates.

Filmography
Screenwriter (unless noted otherwise)

The Lone Ranger (1938) serial
The Mysterious Miss X (1939) (story)
 Hi-Yo Silver (1940)
Man From Frisco (1944) (story)
The Falcon in Mexico (1944)
The Spanish Main (1945)
Sinbad the Sailor (1947) (story)
The Tall Target (1951)
The Last Outpost (1951)
This Woman Is Dangerous (1952)
Those Redheads From Seattle (1953)
China Venture (1953)
Them! (1954) (story)
Conquest of Space (1955)
It Came from Beneath the Sea (1955)
Earth vs. the Flying Saucers (1956)
The Amazing Colossal Man (1957)
Attack of the Puppet People (1958)
Earth vs. the Spider (1958)
The Flame Barrier (1958)
Frankenstein 1970 (1958)
Space Master X-7 (1958)
War of the Colossal Beast (1958)
Tormented (1960)
King Kong vs. Godzilla (1962)

References

External links
 

1901 births
1975 deaths
American male screenwriters
Writers from New York City
People from Sonoma, California
Screenwriters from New York (state)
Screenwriters from California
20th-century American male writers
20th-century American screenwriters